Kuo Tzu-chien (born March 14, 1964) is a Taiwanese comedian, host and actor.

Personal life 
Kuo is married with a son. His first marriage in 1995 lasted only 3 months.

Former Mayor of Hsinchu City Lin Junq-tzer is his older cousin.

In 2012, Kuo launched a claim for 460 million won in compensation against the Ramada Hotel and Suites Seoul in Namdaemun
after he suffered hot water burns from a defective electric kettle which bottom part was already broken before he checked into the hotel. He was on a holiday trip in Seoul with his wife and son in January 2012 when the incident happened. His claim was subsequently dismissed by the Seoul Central District Court in August 2013. In reaction, Kuo initiated a series of protests with a number of Taiwanese television personalities and filed a petition to the Taiwan Human Rights Association that had garnered 10,000 signatures.

In June 2021, Kuo was embroiled in the Taipei Good Liver Clinic vaccination scandal where he was in a group of “wealthy and famous” people who received COVID-19 vaccines at the same time as the designated priority groups such as frontline medical personnel, police and emergency-response workers, among others.

Selected filmography

Television series

Film

Variety and reality show

Published works

Awards and nominations

References

External links 

 
 
 

1964 births
Living people
Taiwanese male television actors
Taiwanese male film actors
Taiwanese television presenters
Taiwanese male comedians
Taiwanese television personalities
20th-century Taiwanese male actors
21st-century Taiwanese male actors
People from Nantou County
Taiwanese male stage actors